Aïn Makhlouf  is a town and commune in Guelma Province, Algeria. According to the 1998 census it has a population of 11,018.

The population is 11 018 in 2002 people.

 Aïn Makhlouf is located on the Berber coastal plain at an altitude of 800 meters, and although generally of Mediterranean climate, snow is known to fall in winter.

References

Communes of Guelma Province